Bellobrad is a village in the south of Kosovo, in the municipality of Dragaš, located the Opolje region of the Šar Mountains.

Notes

References

Villages in Dragash
Šar Mountains